Kiln Creek is a residential community located in Newport News and Yorktown, Virginia. It contains over 2,000 homes in 31 "villages", an elementary school, a golf course, and a recreational center. The community has a board of directors, an architectural review board, and several other committees. 
The community's motto is "A Great Place To Be".

External links
elementary school
golf course
villages
committees
Veterinarian

References

 

Neighborhoods in Newport News, Virginia